Kaljo is an Estonian masculine given name and, less commonly, a surname. 

People named Kaljo include:

As a given name
Kaljo Ellik (1948–2017), Estonian politician 
Kaljo Kiisk (1925–2007), Estonian actor, film director and politician.
Kaljo Põllu (1934–2010), Estonian artist.
Kaljo Pork (1930-1981), Estonian botanist.
Kaljo Raag (1892–1967), Estonian weightlifter, actor and singer.
Kaljo Raid (1921–2005), Estonian composer, cellist and pastor. 

As a surname
Julius Kaljo (1910–1954), Estonian footballer. 

Estonian masculine given names